Owen Michael Roe (born 5 February 1931) is an Australian historian and academic, focusing on Australian history.

Educated at Caulfield Grammar School (he was dux of the school in 1948), Roe attended the University of Melbourne and began studying a combined BA/LL.B. degree. He discontinued law after his first year, and after graduating from his arts degree he studied history at Peterhouse, University of Cambridge. While studying in Cambridge, Roe was taught by Derek John Mulvaney, an Australian archaeologist known as the "father of Australian archaeology".

Roe next undertook doctoral studies in history at the Australian National University on a scholarship.

He became a professor of history at the University of Tasmania, retiring in 1996. He published several history books during his career, including A Short History of Tasmania and Australia, Britain and Migration 1915-1940.

Career 
Roe's fields of research primarily focuses on Australian history, British history, North American history, historical archaeology, heritage and cultural conservation, and industrial archaeology. Furthermore, his research objectives include understanding Australia's past and history alongside expanding knowledge in psychology, history, heritage, human history, and archaeology. Roe has been funded a total of 5 grants from the University of Tasmania under his name. His funded projects include research on a wide range of Tasmanian individuals and history.  From 1985 to 1987, he received a grant to research Herbert Gepp, an Australian industrialist, his zinc company the Electrolytic Zinc Company, and the development and migration commission in the 1920s.  Later in 1994, he received another research grant for Roe's own published book Immigration policy and experience in Australia, 1915-1940 which was completed in 1994. In 1999, two grants were also given to his research on the 1901 General Australian Federal Election as well as research on notable Tasmanian Jane Franklin's personal journals and correspondence. In 2003, a grant was given to finance the book project Companion to Tasmanian History, a collaborative effort with the Centre for Tasmanian Historical Studies at the University of Tasmania.

Works 
 Roe, M., Philip Gidley King, Oxford University Press, (Melbourne), 1963.
 Roe, M., Quest for Authority in Eastern Australia, 1835-1851, Melbourne University Press, (Parkville), 1965.
 Roe, M. (ed.), The Journal and Letters of Captain Charles Bishop on the North-West Coast of America, in the Pacific and in New South Wales, 1794-1799, Cambridge University Press, for the Hakluyt Society, (Cambridge), 1967.
 Roe, M., Kenealy and the Tichborne cause: A Study in Mid-Victorian Populism, Melbourne University Press, (Carlton), 1974.
 Roe, M., Nine Australian Progressives: Vitalism in Bourgeois Social Thought, 1890-1960, University of Queensland Press, (St. Lucia), 1984.
 Roe, M., Australia, Britain, and Migration, 1915-1940: A Study of Desperate Hopes, Cambridge University Press, (Cambridge), 1995.
 Roe, M., A Short History of Tasmania, by Lloyd Robson; Updated by Michael Roe, Oxford University Press, (Melbourne), 1997.
 Roe, M., The State of Tasmania: Identity at Federation Time, Tasmanian Historical Research Association, (Hobart), 2001.
 Roe, M., An Imperial Disaster: The Wreck of George the Third'', Blubber Head Press, (Sandy Bay), 2006.

See also
 List of Caulfield Grammar School people

References

External links
Interview with Roe

1931 births
Living people
Australian historians
Place of birth missing (living people)
People educated at Caulfield Grammar School
Melbourne Law School alumni
Alumni of Peterhouse, Cambridge
Academics from Melbourne